Ricky Glenn (born April 12, 1989) is an American mixed martial artist currently competing in the Lightweight division of the UFC. A professional since 2006, he is the former World Series of Fighting Featherweight Champiom.

Background
Glenn was born in Marshalltown, Iowa, an idyllic small town of Midwest America. With an adventure spirit, he had interest in BMX biking but the interest in fighting outweighed biking since he was young. He did a year of wrestling at Marshalltown High School and started boxing training when he was fourteen. He loved combat sport so much that when his local boxing gym closed down, he travelled one and half hour each trip to other gym to get his boxing practice. He later transitioned to MMA training at a friend's basement and switch to his uncle's garage.

When Glenn was seventeen, still a high school student and with one year wrestling, some boxing experience and self-taught MMA skills, he was asked to fight on a short notice for a local promotion. Still in his work uniform, Glenn left his work at a local Staples shift early in Marshalltown, rushing out to the venue, in time for a few stretches, and stepped in the cage 5 minutes later, winning his first fight. This win set of his MMA career where he put it “He was a tough guy, but I cut him up really good. I was shocked, I mean, I was fighting for my life in there. I was fighting grown men when I was in high school, and that first win meant everything.”

After high school, Glenn moved to Cedar Rapids and attended a community college, majoring in physical therapy. He joined a MMA gym under Duke Roufus guidance where his training partner was Erik Kock and Ben Askren.

Glenn fought 17 amateur fights in a short period with record of 15–1–1 and he would go on to fight 21 times professionally, losing only 3 bouts, and 97% of his wins have been by way of knockout, submission, or TKO prior signed by UFC. He moved to Milwaukee and left his employment at Costco to train full-time.

Mixed martial arts career

Early career
Glenn fought most of the fights in regional Midwest of American. He was the World Series of Fighting (WSOF) featherweight champion and Midwest Cage Fight featherweight champion. Glenn amassed a record of 18–3–1 prior signed by UFC. In his past 17 bouts, Glenn's only loss was to WSOF featherweight champion Lance Palmer, and he held notable victories over Johnny Case and Georgi Karakhanyan.

Ultimate Fighting Championship
Glenn made his promotion debut on September 17, 2016 at UFC Fight Night: Poirier vs. Johnson against Evan Dunham in Texas. He moved up to lightweight for this fight bout replacing injured Abel Trujillo on 12 days notice.  He was bested by Dunham via unanimous decision and this unsuccessful debut snapped a three-fight winning streak since losing his WSOF title to Lance Palmer in 2014.

He next faced Phillipe Nover on February 11, 2017 at UFC 208. He outpointed Nover and win via split decision (27-30, 29–28, 29-28).

Glenn faced Gavin Tucker on October 9, 2017 at UFC 215. He won the fight by unanimous decision. Tucker suffered four broken bones on his face during the one-sided beating from Glenn and many criticized the referee, Kyle Cardinal, for not stopping the fight.

Glenn faced Myles Jury on December 30, 2017 at UFC 219. He lost the fight by unanimous decision.

Glenn faced Dennis Bermudez on July 14, 2018 at UFC Fight Night 133. He won the fight via split decision.

Glenn was scheduled to face Arnold Allen on November 30, 2018 at The Ultimate Fighter 28 Finale. However, Allen pulled out of the fight on November 16 citing a cut he received while training, and he was replaced by Kevin Aguilar. At the weigh-ins, Glenn weighed in at 148.5 pounds, 2.5 pounds over the featherweight non-title fight limit of 146. He was fined 20 percent of their purse, which went to his opponent Kevin Aguilar. The bout proceeded at catchweight. Glenn lost the fight via unanimous decision.

Moving up to Lightweight
Glenn was scheduled to face Carlton Minus on December 19, 2020 at UFC Fight Night 183. However during fight week, it was announced that Glenn had to be pulled out of the bout.

Glenn faced Joaquim Silva on June 19, 2021 at UFC on ESPN 25. He won the bout via knockout just 37 seconds into the first round. The fight marked the last of his prevailing contract, and he subsequently signed a new, four-fight contract with the UFC.

Glenn faced Grant Dawson on October 23, 2021 at UFC Fight Night: Costa vs. Vettori. The fight ended in majority draw.

Glenn was scheduled to face Drew Dober on March 12, 2022 at UFC Fight Night 203. However, a week before the event, Glenn withdrew due to a torn groin and was replaced by Terrance McKinney.

Glenn is scheduled to face Christos Giagos on April 22, 2023, at UFC Fight Night 222.

Personal life
Glenn's moniker "The Gladiator" was given to him by his uncle for his killer instinct demeanour inside the boxing ring.

Glenn and his wife Jenny have a son, Jaxson (born 2021).

Championships and accomplishments
World Series of Fighting
WSOF Featherweight Championship (One time; former)
Midwest Cage Fight
Midwest Cage Fight Featherweight Champion (One time; former)

Mixed martial arts record

|-
|Draw
|align=center|22–6–2
|Grant Dawson
|Draw (majority)
|UFC Fight Night: Costa vs. Vettori
|
|align=center|3
|align=center|5:00
|Las Vegas, Nevada, United States
|
|-
|Win
|align=center|22–6–1
|Joaquim Silva
|KO (punches)
|UFC on ESPN: The Korean Zombie vs. Ige
|
|align=center|1
|align=center|0:37
|Las Vegas, Nevada, United States
|
|-
|Loss
|align=center|21–6–1
|Kevin Aguilar
|Decision (unanimous)
|The Ultimate Fighter: Heavy Hitters Finale 
|
|align=center|3
|align=center|5:00
|Las Vegas, Nevada, United States
|
|-
|Win
|align=center|21–5–1
|Dennis Bermudez
|Decision (split)
|UFC Fight Night: dos Santos vs. Ivanov 
|
|align=center|3
|align=center|5:00
|Boise, Idaho, United States
|
|-
|Loss
|align=center|20–5–1
|Myles Jury
|Decision (unanimous)
|UFC 219
|
|align=center|3
|align=center|5:00
|Las Vegas, Nevada, United States
|
|-
|Win
| align=center| 20–4–1
|Gavin Tucker
|Decision (unanimous)
|UFC 215 
|
|align=center|3
|align=center|5:00
|Edmonton, Alberta, Canada
|
|-
| Win
| align=center| 19–4–1
| Phillipe Nover
| Decision (split)
| UFC 208
| 
| align=center|3
| align=center| 5:00
| Brooklyn, New York, United States
|
|-
| Loss
| align=center| 18–4–1
| Evan Dunham
| Decision (unanimous)
| UFC Fight Night: Poirier vs. Johnson
| 
| align=center|3
| align=center|5:00
| Hidalgo, Texas, United States
|
|-
| Win
| align=center| 18–3–1
| Ramiro Hernandez
| Decision (split)
| Victory Fighting Championship 51
| 
| align=center|3
| align=center|5:00
| Urbandale, Iowa, United States
|
|-
| Win
| align=center| 17–3–1
| Chris Manuel
| TKO (body punches)
| Pure Fighting Championship 3
| 
| align=center|3
| align=center| 2:03
| Milwaukee, Wisconsin, United States
|
|-
| Win
| align=center| 16–3–1
| Adam Ward
| KO (punches)
| WSOF 24
| 
| align=center|2
| align=center| 1:27
| Mashantucket, Connecticut, United States
|
|-
| Loss
| align=center| 15–3–1
| Lance Palmer
| Submission (rear-naked choke)
| WSOF 16
| 
| align=center| 3
| align=center| 3:09
| Sacramento, California, United States
|
|-
| Win
| align=center| 15–2–1
| Georgi Karakhanyan
| TKO (retirement)
| WSOF 10
| 
| align=center|2 
| align=center| 5:00
| Las Vegas, Nevada, United States
|
|-
| Win
| align=center| 14–2–1
| Artur Rofi
| Decision (unanimous)
| WSOF 5
| 
| align=center| 3
| align=center| 5:00
| Atlantic City, New Jersey, United States
|
|-
| Win
| align=center| 13–2–1
| Alexandre Pimentel
| KO (punches)
| WSOF 2
| 
| align=center| 3
| align=center| 1:51
| Atlantic City, New Jersey, United States
|
|-
| Win
| align=center| 12–2–1
| Lyndon Whitlock
| TKO (knees to the body and punches)
| Score Fighting Series 6
| 
| align=center| 3
| align=center| 2:34
| Sarnia, Ontario, Canada
|
|-
| Win
| align=center| 11–2–1
| Tristan Johnson
| TKO (punches)
| Score Fighting Series 5
| 
| align=center| 2
| align=center| 4:26
| Hamilton, Ontario, Canada
|
|-
| Win
| align=center| 
| Charon Spain
| TKO (elbow and punches)
| North American FC: Colosseum
| 
| align=center| 2
| align=center| 0:29
| Milwaukee, Wisconsin, United States
|
|-
| Win
| align=center| 9–2–1
| Jose Pacheco
| Decision (unanimous)
| North American FC: Unleashed
| 
| align=center| 3
| align=center| 5:00
| Milwaukee, Wisconsin, United States
|
|-
| Win
| align=center| 8–2–1
| Gustavo Rodriguez
| TKO (punches)
| KOTC: Interference
| 
| align=center| 2
| align=center| 1:46
| Lac du Flambeau, Wisconsin, United States
|
|-
| Draw
| align=center| 7–2–1
| Ryan Roberts
| Draw
| Midwest Cage Fight 35
| 
| align=center| 5
| align=center| 5:00
| Des Moines, Iowa, United States
|
|-
| Win
| align=center| 7–2
| Josh Henry
| Submission (triangle choke)
| Midwest Cage Fight 32
| 
| align=center| 1
| align=center| 3:41
| Des Moines, Iowa, United States
|
|-
| Win
| align=center| 6–2
| Josh Henry
| Submission (armbar)
| Midwest Cage Fight 31
| 
| align=center| 1
| align=center| 0:32
| Des Moines, Iowa, United States
|
|-
| Win
| align=center| 5–2
| Johnny Case
| TKO (punches)
| Midwest Cage Fight 29
| 
| align=center| 1
| align=center| 4:07
| Des Moines, Iowa, United States
|
|-
| Win
| align=center| 4–2
| Colby Karadios
| TKO (punches)
| Midwest Cage Fight 27
| 
| align=center| 1
| align=center| 2:49
| Des Moines, Iowa, United States
|
|-
| Loss
| align=center| 3–2
| Lonnie Scriven
| Decision (split)
| Midwest Cage Fight 25
| 
| align=center| 3
| align=center| 5:00
| Des Moines, Iowa, United States
|
|-
| Win
| align=center| 3–1
| Joe Morris
| Submission (triangle choke)
| Midwest Cage Fight 24
| 
| align=center| 1
| align=center| 4:57
| Des Moines, Iowa, United States
|
|-
| Loss
| align=center| 2–1
| Jimmy Seipel
| Submission (armbar)
| Victory FC 28
| 
| align=center| 1
| align=center| 2:31
| Council Bluffs, Iowa, United States
|
|-
| Win
| align=center| 2–0
| Ted Reynolds
| TKO (punches)
| War Party Cage Fighting 4
| 
| align=center| 1
| align=center| 1:56
| Marshalltown, Iowa, United States
|
|-
| Win
| align=center| 1–0
| Bob Morgan
| TKO (submission to punches)
| War Party Cage Fighting 3
| 
| align=center| 2
| align=center| 2:25
| Marshalltown, Iowa, United States
|
|-

See also
 List of current UFC fighters
 List of male mixed martial artists

References

External links
 
 

1989 births
Living people
American male mixed martial artists
Featherweight mixed martial artists
Mixed martial artists utilizing wrestling
Mixed martial artists utilizing boxing
Mixed martial artists utilizing Brazilian jiu-jitsu
People from Marshalltown, Iowa
Mixed martial artists from Iowa
Ultimate Fighting Championship male fighters
American practitioners of Brazilian jiu-jitsu